Ninette is a Spanish comedy film directed by José Luis Garci. Released in 2005, it is based on the plays Ninette y un señor de Murcia and Ninette, modas de París by Miguel Mihura.

Plot
Ninette Sánchez (Elsa Pataky) is an intelligent, sexy, charming and spontaneous Parisian girl, daughter of Spanish republican exiles, working in the Galeries Lafayette. Her ingenuousness and beauty charms Andrés (Carlos Hipólito), a humble Spanish vendor of religious items from Murcia, who is staying with her family after he came to Paris to meet "easy" French women. Andrés falls for her many charms. Unfortunately, Ninette's parents, Armando (Enrique Villén) and Bernarda (Beatriz Carvajal) do not take the news well when Ninette announces that she is pregnant.

Cast 
 Carlos Hipólito as Andrés
 Elsa Pataky as Alejandra 'Ninette'
 Enrique Villén as Armando
 Beatriz Carvajal as Madame Bernarda
 Fernando Delgado as Monsieur Pierre
 Mar Regueras as Maruja
 Miguel Rellán as Don Roque
 Javivi as Vecino de Ninette / Director del hotel
 Carlos Iglesias as Jugador de mus
 Eduardo Gómez as Jugador de mus
 Jorge Roelas as Jugador de mus
 Luis José Ventin as (billed as Luis Ventín)
 María Elena Flores as Melchora

DVD release
 Ninette  is available in Region 2 DVD in Spanish with English subtitles.

See also 
 List of Spanish films of 2005

External links
 

2005 romantic comedy films
Films shot in Madrid
2000s Spanish-language films
2005 films
Films set in Paris
Spanish romantic comedy films
Films directed by José Luis Garci
2000s Spanish films